Jack Doohan (born 20 January 2003) is an Australian race car driver serving as reserve driver for Alpine F1 Team and currently competing in the FIA Formula 2 Championship with Invicta Virtuosi Racing. He is the 2021 FIA Formula 3 vice-champion and a former member of the Red Bull Junior Team.He is the son of motorcycle rider Mick Doohan, who is a five-time 500cc world champion.

Career

Lower formulae 

Doohan started his single-seater career at the age of 15 in the F4 British Championship with the TRS Arden Junior Racing Team, alongside fellow Red Bull junior Dennis Hauger. He scored three wins throughout the season, with his first car racing victory coming at Thruxton. The Australian finished fifth in the standings, just one point behind Hauger.

That year Doohan also participated in both the German and Italian Formula 4 championships for Prema Powerteam on a part-time basis. He finished 12th and 20th in the standings respectively, scoring no podiums.

F3 Asian Championship 
In 2019 Doohan made his first appearance in the F3 Asian Championship. Driving for Hitech Grand Prix, the Aussie won five races and ended up second in the championship, 25 points adrift of the experienced Ukyo Sasahara.

The next winter he returned to the series with Pinnacle Motorsport. He once again finished in the runner-up spot, this time behind Joey Alders.

FIA Formula 3 Championship

2020 
In 2020 Doohan progressed to the FIA Formula 3 Championship, driving for HWA Racelab. Partnering Jake Hughes and FDA-member Enzo Fittipaldi, Doohan did not score any points during the campaign, and with a best finish of eleventh place, which came at the final race in Mugello, he classified 26th in the drivers' championship. Despite describing the year as having been "very very tough", Doohan maintained that he had been able to learn more from it than he would have from a more successful season.

2021 

For the 2021 season Doohan made the switch to Trident to partner Clément Novalak and David Schumacher. He started his season off strong with a second place in the Barcelona feature race, and took his first F3 victory after overtaking Dennis Hauger with a few laps to go in the feature race at Le Castellet. Despite scoring another podium in the first sprint race at the Red Bull Ring, having benefited from a penalty for Logan Sargeant, Doohan would fall back in the championship compared to his title rival Hauger during that round. The Australian returned to the feature race podium in Hungary, but it was the following weekend where he achieved his biggest success of the campaign: having taken pole position on Friday, Doohan won both the second sprint race and the feature race at Spa-Francorchamps, making him the first FIA Formula 3 driver to score two victories on the same weekend. However, a mistake in the second race at Zandvoort cost him a heap of points, meaning that Hauger could clinch the title with one race to go at Sochi. Doohan capped off his own season in style, winning the final feature race from pole, having defied team orders to let through his teammate Novalak during the race. His victory made sure that Trident were able to win the teams' championship, as Doohan finished second in the standings, 26 points behind Hauger.

FIA Formula 2 Championship

2021: Partial campaign 
Doohan joined MP Motorsport for the final two rounds of the 2021 championship. He achieved a best finish of 5th in just his 2nd race, in Jeddah.

2022 

On December 13, 2021, it was announced that Doohan would join Virtuosi Racing alongside Marino Sato for the 2022 championship. His start to the season looked promising, as he would score pole position in the season opener at Bahrain. However, a collision with Théo Pourchaire at the pit exit during the feature race broke his front wing, taking the Australian out of the battle for the lead. Nevertheless, Doohan found positives in his performance, stating that he "[had been] as quick as anyone" during the race. A disappointing round in Jeddah, where he was disqualified from qualifying due to a technical infringement and was involved in a race-ending collision with Logan Sargeant, was followed up by an even more disastrous round at Imola, where a clash with Dennis Hauger at the start of the feature race put him out of the running. Nevertheless, the Australian soldiered on, taking another pole position in the fourth round in Barcelona. Setting his target towards "[getting] some points on the board" for the feature race, Doohan would score his first podium of the season on Sunday, ending up second after being overtaken by championship leader Felipe Drugovich in the latter half of the race. Points in both Monaco races were followed up by two finishes in the midfield in Baku, however at the Silverstone Circuit Doohan would take his first victory of the season, fighting his way up to first in the sprint race in wet conditions. Doohan continued this form by scoring another podium at the Red Bull Ring, and at the final round before the summer break, held in Budapest, the Australian would win once again, dominating the sprint race on Saturday.

After the summer break, Doohan experienced an exceptional round at Spa-Francorchamps, finishing second in the sprint race after starting in seventh and taking his first victory in a feature race the day after, which promoted him to fourth in the standings. Doohan qualified in second the next week at Zandvoort, but a collision with Richard Verschoor on a safety car restart left him unable to finish. He scored his third pole of the year at Monza, although a bad start and a subsequent collision with Jehan Daruvala brought about a premature end to his race once more. Doohan's horrid luck continued into the final round of the year at Yas Marina, where a loose wheel forced him to retire in the feature race. He ended up sixth in the drivers' standings, third-highest of the rookies.

2023 
Doohan partook in the 2022 post-season test, remaining with Virtuosi. Soon after, he was confirmed to continuing his relationship with the British outfit for the 2023 campaign, alongside Amaury Cordeel.

Doohan had a terrible opening round in Bahrain, a poor qualifying in P17 would not reward him with any points.

Formula One 
In September 2017 Doohan was signed to the Red Bull Junior Team. He left the academy following his 2021 season and signed to the Alpine Academy in 2022. Doohan described his switch as being a "no-brainer", stating that the F1 testing programme and the team's project within the World Endurance Championship gave him a myriad of opportunities for the future. He would get his first chance to test the Alpine A521 at the Losail International Circuit in May of that year. He then drove the car again at the Monza Circuit prior to the British Grand Prix weekend. In September, Doohan tested with the Alpine A521 at the Hungaroring, alongside Antonio Giovinazzi and Nyck de Vries. Doohan also took part in the post-season tests with the Alpine.

In 2023, Doohan was announced as the reserve driver for Alpine.

Karting record

Karting career summary 

† As Doohan was a guest driver, he was ineligible for points.

Racing record

Racing career summary

† As Doohan was a guest driver, he was ineligible for points.
* Season still in progress.

Complete F4 British Championship results
(key) (Races in bold indicate pole position) (Races in italics indicate fastest lap)

Complete F3 Asian Championship results 
(key) (Races in bold indicate pole position) (Races in italics indicate fastest lap)

Complete Euroformula Open Championship results 
(key) (Races in bold indicate pole position) (Races in italics indicate fastest lap)

Complete FIA Formula 3 Championship results
(key) (Races in bold indicate pole position; races in italics indicate points for the fastest lap of top ten finishers)

Complete FIA Formula 2 Championship results 
(key) (Races in bold indicate pole position) (Races in italics indicate fastest lap)

* Season still in progress.

Complete Formula One participations 
(key) (Races in bold indicate pole position) (Races in italics indicate fastest lap)

* Season still in progress.

References

External links
  
 

2003 births
Living people
Racing drivers from Brisbane
British F4 Championship drivers
ADAC Formula 4 drivers
Italian F4 Championship drivers
FIA Formula 3 Championship drivers
F3 Asian Championship drivers
Arden International drivers
Prema Powerteam drivers
Double R Racing drivers
Hitech Grand Prix drivers
Pinnacle Motorsport drivers
HWA Team drivers
Trident Racing drivers
MP Motorsport drivers
FIA Formula 2 Championship drivers
Virtuosi Racing drivers
MRF Challenge Formula 2000 Championship drivers
Karting World Championship drivers